Legrad is a municipality in northern Croatia, located north of Koprivnica and east of Ludbreg in the Koprivnica–Križevci County. There are 2,241 inhabitants in the municipality, absolute majority of which are Croats at 97.4%, with the largest minority being Romani at 1% of the municipality. Beside the Roman Catholic majority, there are Hungarian and Croatian Lutherans that have a tradition beginning in the 16th century.

History
Due to its favorable geographical position, Legrad became a chartered market town as early as 1488. Since the mid-16th century, fortifications have been built to protect the town from Ottoman incursions. By the 17th century, Legrad was a major trading post for cattle which attracted merchants from Venice and Italy. The highly profitable cattle trade, run by the Zrinski family, was used to finance their standing army and the defense against the Ottomans. The development of trade and handcrafting contributed to the demographic growth, and in 1771 Legrad and neighboring villages were recorded as having as many as 6,039 inhabitants. Cattle fairs in Legrad held their relevance into the 18th and 19th centuries.

Legrad got a railway station on the other side of the river Drava in Hungary in the second half of the 19th century and that the name of this train station was Légrád until a few years ago (see: Serbian-Hungarian Baranya-Baja Republic).

It is historically very important that Novi Zrin was near Legrad.

In the late 19th century and early 20th century, Legrad was part of the Zala County of the Kingdom of Hungary.

References

Populated places in Koprivnica-Križevci County
Municipalities of Croatia